Kenny Cheng Siu Kwan (born 13 January 1997) is a Hong Kong professional footballer who currently plays as a right winger for Hong Kong Premier League club Lee Man.

Club career
On 17 July 2018, Cheng was named as one of fourteen new players at Lee Man.

International career
On 10 September 2019, Cheng made his senior international debut for Hong Kong in the World Cup qualifier match against Iran.

Career statistics

International

Honours
Lee Man
 Hong Kong Sapling Cup: 2018-19

Hong Kong
 Guangdong-Hong Kong Cup: 2019

Individual
 Best Young Player: 2019

References

External links
 
 Cheng Siu Kwan at the HKFA
 

1997 births
Living people
Hong Kong footballers
Association football midfielders
Association football wingers
Hong Kong Rangers FC players
Dreams Sports Club players
Lee Man FC players
Hong Kong Premier League players
Hong Kong international footballers
Hong Kong League XI representative players